Avaria constanti is a species of moth of the family Tortricidae. It is found on the Canary Islands.

The wingspan is 13–14 mm. The forewings are yellowish brown with brownish sprinkling and reddish to blackish-brown markings. The hindwings are greyish brown.

References

Moths described in 1894
Archipini
Moths of Africa